This article contains information about the literary events and publications of 1677.

Events
January 1 – Jean Racine's tragedy Phèdre is first performed, at the Hôtel de Bourgogne (theatre) in Paris.
February 
Nathaniel Lee's blank verse tragedy The Rival Queens, or the Death of Alexander the Great is performed at the Theatre Royal, Drury Lane, London, with Mrs. Charlotte Melmoth as Roxana.
Thomas Killigrew, ineffective after four years as Master of the Revels, is replaced by his son Charles.
September – Edward Ravenscroft's tragicomedy King Edgar and Alfreda, on the subject of King Edgar of England. Thomas Rymer's less successful play on the same subject is published in 1678.
date unknown
Roger Morrice begins his Entring Book, a manual diary describing society in the period 1677 to 1691.
Froinsias Ó Maolmhuaidh's Grammatica Latino-Hibernica nunc compendiata, the first printed grammar of the Irish language (in Latin), is published by the Congregation of Propaganda Fide in Rome in the year of his death.

New books

Prose
Roger Boyle, 1st Earl of Orrery – Treatise of the Art of War
Edward Cocker – Cocker's Arithmetick
Christian Knorr von Rosenroth – Kabbala Denudata (publication starts)
John Mason – Major Mason's Brief History of the Pequot War
John Milton – The History of Britain
Francis North, 1st Baron Guilford – A Philosophical Essay of Music
Eirenaeus Philalethes – An Exposition upon Sir George Ripley's Vision.
Baruch Spinoza – Opera Posthuma (with first known publication of his Ethics)
Fabian Stedman – Tintinnalogia, or, the Art of Ringing

Drama
John Banks – The Rival Kings (adapted from la Calprenède's Cassandre)
Aphra Behn 
The Rover
 The Counterfeit Bridegroom
The Debauchee (adapted from Richard Brome's A Mad Couple Well-Match'd)
Thomas Betterton – The Counterfeit Bridegroom
William Cavendish, Duke of Newcastle – The Humorous Lovers and The Triumphant Widow published
John Crowne – The Destruction of Jerusalem by Titus Vespasian, Parts 1 and 2
Charles Davenant – Circe (a "semi-opera" with music by John Banister)
Thomas d'Urfey – A Fond Husband
John Leanerd – The Country Innocence
Nathaniel Lee – The Rival Queens
Thomas Otway 
The Cheats of Scapin (adapted from Molière's Fourberies de Scapin)
Titus and Berenice (adapted from Racine's Bérénice)
 Samuel Pordage – The Siege of Babylon
Thomas Porter –  The French Conjuror 
Jean Racine – Phèdre
Edward Ravenscroft
King Edgar and Alfreda
Scaramouch a Philosopher, Harlequin a Schoolboy, Bravo a Merchant and Magician
Thomas Rymer – Edgar, or the English Monarch
Pedro Calderon de la Barca
Amar después de la muerte o El Tuzaní de la Alpujarra
Parte I de autos sacramentales, alegóricos e historiales

Poetry
Roger Boyle, 1st Earl of Orrery – On the Death of Abraham Cowley

Births
August 23 – Marie Anne Doublet, French scholar, writer and salonnière (died 1771)
August 25 – Jean-Joseph Languet de Gergy, French theologian (died 1753)
Unknown date – Elizabeth, Lady Wardlaw, English ballad writer (born 1727)
Probable date – George Farquhar, Irish-born dramatist (died 1707)

Deaths
February 21 – Baruch Spinoza, Dutch philosopher (born 1632)
May 24 – Anders Bording, Danish poet and journalist (born 1619)
June 18 – Johann Franck, German poet, hymnist and politician (born 1618)
June 24 – Dudley North, English poet, writer and politician (born 1602)
July 9 – Angelus Silesius (Johann Scheffler), German poet and mystic (born 1624)
September 5 – Henry Oldenburg, German-born theologian and natural philosopher (born c. 1619)
September 11 – James Harrington, English political theorist (born 1611)
October 14 – Francis Glisson, English medical writer and physician (born 1597)
December 24 – Jacques de Coras, French poet (born 1630)

References

 
Years of the 17th century in literature